The Caribbean Maritime University is a Jamaican higher education institution specialising in maritime education and training. Its primary campus is located on the Palisadoes Park, overlooking the Kingston Harbour.

History

The first two decades, 1980–2001 
In 1979, the governments of Jamaica and Norway formed a joint committee to examine the feasibility of opening a merchant marine training school in Jamaica. In an agreement signed on 2 May 1980, the Norwegian government granted 9 million Norwegian krone (3.1 million Jamaican dollars) for the development of the maritime sector, specifically for maritime training. The purpose of the institute was to train officers for the Jamaican merchant marine, a small fleet of ships owned by the government. Formally, these ships came under Jamaica Merchant Marine Limited and Jamaica Merchant Marine Atlantic Line Limited.

The Jamaica Maritime Training Institute (JMTI) began its first semester on 15 September 1980, with a student population of 16. It was located on Norman Road in Kingston, Jamaica. The institute was originally staffed by five Norwegian lecturers, and its first directors were from Norway. By 1983, the student population had grown to 26, with half engaged in nautical training and the other half in marine engineering. Only two students in the initial cohort were female. In 1985, the JMTI moved to Palisadoes Park, between the Royal Jamaica Yacht Club and Gun Boat Beach. It had a student population of 64 in 1990, at which point it announced a program of "Jamaicanisation" to reduce the reliance on Norwegian staff.

In the early 1990s, JMTI collaborated with the Human Employment and Resource Training Trust/National Training Agency (HEART/NTA) to provide training for ratings. It also began offering an expanded curriculum to parts of the maritime industry that were not seafarers, which it did in collaboration with the Pacific Maritime Training Institute, a campus of the British Columbia Institute of Technology (BCIT) in Canada.

The first two decades brought challenges, including the lack of sea time for cadets, and difficulties in finding qualified staff to teach. A solution to the latter problem was devised as promising candidates were fast-tracked through a Norwegian teaching program before joining the Institute. In 1994, a Diploma in International Shipping and Logistics was introduced in collaboration with BCIT, and in 1996 an Associate of Applied Science Degree in Industrial Systems, Operations and Maintenance was introduced in collaboration with the University of Technology in Jamaica. Further diplomas in transport, logistics, and marine engineering were also launched.

In January 1993, the Jamaica Maritime Institute Act was passed through the Parliament of Jamaica, providing a statutory basis for the Institute. Its name was legally changed to Jamaica Maritime Institute (JMI). The functions were set out: to provide training for officers and ratings, to provide training for shore-based industries, to hold examinations, to make awards, and to provide a resource centre "with a view to the development and maintenance of a vibrant shipping industry in the Caribbean region." In 2001, the act was amended to change the name to the Caribbean Maritime Institute (CMI), a decision made to reflect the regional nature of the student body and the training.

Caribbean Maritime Institute, 2001–2017 
Around the year 2000, the Institute began offering the Caribbean Diploma in Shipping Logistics as a distance-learning course to students from six Caribbean countries, through a collaboration with the University of the West Indies (UWI) Distance Education Centre and the Caribbean Shipping Association. 26 of the original 31 cohort graduated. In 2005, the student population of CMI was 394. The Institute's facilities were heavily damaged by Hurricane Dean in 2007. In 2008, the CMI planned to launch a Master of Science degree in International Shipping Management and Logistics, in collaboration with the Cyprus International Institute of Management. The Institute built up a number of international partnerships, for which it was praised by the Governor-General.

Caribbean Maritime University, 2017 onwards 
In 2017, the CMI was renamed the Caribbean Maritime University (CMU).

Buildings and sites 
The main campus of the CMU has been at Palisadoes Park, on the Palisadoes, since 1985. There is also a campus at Port Royal, which delivers Bachelor of Science courses. CMU operates satellite locations at Sam Sharpe Teachers College, Montego Bay, Knox Community College, Mandeville, and Moneague College, Moneague. At the satellite locations, CMU delivers specific undergraduate programs.

Organisation

Leadership and governance 
In 1992, Michael Rodriguez, formerly a Lieutenant Commander in the Jamaica Defence Force Coast Guard, was appointed as Executive Director. He was the first Jamaican director. Fritz Pinnock, a shipping executive, was appointed to replace him in 2006.

Under the Caribbean Maritime University Act, CMU has a Council and Academic Board. The former is the ultimate authority in the governance of the university, while the latter holds responsibility for academic affairs.

Faculties 
CMU has four faculties:

 Faculty of Engineering and Applied Technology (FEAT): industrial systems, industrial automation, mechatronics, marine biotechnology, artificial intelligence and computer studies
 Faculty of Marine and Nautical Sciences (FMNS): nautical studies, marine engineering, marine transport
 Faculty of Shipping and Logistics (FSL): shipping, logistics, port management, and customs
 Faculty of General Studies (FGS): language, communication, and humanities

References

Universities and colleges in Jamaica
Education in Kingston, Jamaica